Alakkode Road is a suburb of Taliparamba town consisting a number of small and populated villaged on the road to Alakode.

Populated Villages
 Kooveri. 18,000 people
 Kuttiyeri. 10,528  people
 Panniyoor. 10,722 people
 Chapparapadavu 14,883 people
 Kanhirangad 5,000 people
 Alakode 33, 600 people
 Kooveri 17,908 people
 Eruvassy. 19,175 people

Paithalmala Hills
Paithalmala is a hill station near Taliparamba on the way to Alakode.  It is 1371 meters above sea level and attracts many trekkers.  It is nestled in the Kodagu forests on the border with the neighboring Karnataka province.

Chapparapadavu

Chapparapadavu is a village (panchayath) in Kannur district in the Indian state of Kerala. The villages of Koovery, Kottakkanam, and Therandi are part of the panchayath. Chapparapadavu has 14,883 people.

Image gallery

Location

See also
 Dharmasala,Kannur
 Karimbam, Taliparamba
 Paithalmala
 Taliparamba
 Taliparamba West

References

Taliparamba